Paradoliops humerosa is a species of beetle in the family Cerambycidae. It was described by Heller in 1921.

References

Apomecynini
Beetles described in 1921